The California Coast Conference was a short-lived intercollegiate athletic football conference that existed from 1922 to 1928. The league had members in California. All of the two-year schools that were in the conference are now members of a conference within the California Community College Athletic Association.  Of the four-year schools, Fresno State Normal, State Teachers College at San Jose, Chico State Teachers College, and College of the Pacific (CA) left the conference and joined the Far Western Conference.  Cal Poly did not become a 4-year school until 1941, and played as an independent after leaving the CCC.  Loyola (CA) joined the West Coast Conference, while Santa Barbara State Teachers College joined the California Collegiate Athletic Association.

Members

Champions

1922 – Fresno State Normal (2–0–1)
1923 – Fresno State Normall (3–0–0) and Pacific (CA) (4–0–0)
1924 – Chico State Teachers College (4–0–0)
1925 – Chico State Teachers College def. San Mateo Junior College (forfeit) (Championship game)
1926 – Chico State Teachers College (5–0–0)
1927 – Sacramento Junior College def. Chico State Teachers College (Championship game)
1928 – Co-champions: State Teachers College at San Jose tied San Mateo Junior College (Championship game)

See also
List of defunct college football conferences

References

 
College sports in California
Sports organizations established in 1922